The Woods Are Full of Cuckoos is a 1937 Merrie Melodies cartoon directed by Frank Tashlin. The short was released on December 4, 1937.

Plot
The cartoon starts with an owl named "Owl Kott" (satirizing Alexander Woolcott's Town Crier radio program) giving an introduction to the festivities. This is followed by a Ben Bernie caricature called "Ben Birdie", feuding with "Walter Finchell". The same spoof was used in the cartoon The CooCoo Nut Grove (1936). Walter Winchell had a well-publicized feud with Bernie at the time, which, like Jack Benny's "feud" with Fred Allen, was faked for publicity purposes – Bernie and Winchell were actually good friends.

Next is "Milton Squirrel" (Milton Berle, Master of Ceremony , M.C.  of Gillette Community Sing) introducing "Wendell Howl" (Wendell Hall) and an audience trying to figure out which page to go to in their songbooks, which results in Wendell getting pelted by the audience's songbooks. Then, "Billy Goat and "Ernie Bear" (Billy Jones and Ernie Hare) and everyone else sings a song with the lyrics:

The Woods are full of cuckoos,
Cuckoos, cuckoos,
The Woods are full of cuckoos
and my heart is full of love.

During the song, a fox (a caricature of Fred Allen) called "Mr. Allen" is told that he's singing "Swanee River" instead of the actual song. Then the song is sung by "Eddie Gander" (Eddie Cantor), "Sophie Turkey" (Sophie Tucker), "W.C. Fieldmouse" (W. C. Fields), "Dick Fowl" (Dick Powell), "Fats Swallow" (Fats Waller), "Deanna Terrapin" (Deanna Durbin), "Irvin S. Frog" (Irvin S. Cobb), "Fred McFurry" (Fred MacMurray), "Bing Crowsby" (Bing Crosby), "Al Goatson" (Al Jolson), "Ruby Squealer" (Ruby Keeler, Jolson's wife at the time), and "Lanny Hoss" (Lanny Ross). Then "Grace Moose" (Grace Moore) and "Lily Swans" (Lily Pons) sing notes, each note higher than the other. Comedian and jazz singer Martha Raye (caricatured here as a mule named "Moutha Bray") makes an appearance in a scatting jazz take.  More caricatures appear, including movie critic and gossip columnist "Louella Possums" (Louella Parsons), Raven McQuandry (Haven McQuarrie, emcee of Do You Want To Be An Actor?), Joe Penguin (Joe Penner), Tizzie Fish ("Tizzie Lish", a character on Al Pearce's radio show), Jack Bunny (Jack Benny), Mary Livingstone, and Andy Devine (a regular on Benny's radio program). Finally Owl Kott finishes the cartoon by bidding the audience goodnight, and saying "All is well, all is well..."

Home media
LaserDisc - The Golden Age of Looney Tunes, Volume 4, Side 5
DVD - Looney Tunes Golden Collection: Volume 3, Disc 2

Notes
The cartoon is notable for being a parody/send-up of several different radio programs of the era, particularly the then-popular "community sing" programs. Author and critic Alexander Woollcott is parodied as Owl Kott in the cartoon, a parody that Tashlin would revisit in another Merrie Melodies'' cartoon, "Have You Got Any Castles?", which was released in 1938.

References

External links

1937 films
1937 animated films
Animation based on real people
Merrie Melodies short films
Short films directed by Frank Tashlin
1930s American animated films
Films based on radio series
Cultural depictions of W. C. Fields
Cultural depictions of Bing Crosby
Cultural depictions of Al Jolson
Cultural depictions of Fats Waller
American black-and-white films